NGC 419 is a globular cluster located approximately  from Earth in the constellation Tucana. It was discovered on September 2, 1826 by James Dunlop. It was described by Dreyer as "pretty large, pretty bright, round, gradually brighter middle." At a distance of about 186,000 light years (57,000 parsecs), it is located within the Small Magellanic Cloud. At an aperture of 50 arcseconds, its apparent V-band magnitude is 10.30, but at this wavelength, it has 0.15 magnitudes of interstellar extinction.

NGC 419 is about 1.45 billion years old. All else equal, older star clusters have higher mass-to-luminosity ratios; that is, they have lower luminosities for the same mass.

References

External links
 

0419
18260902
Tucana (constellation)
Open clusters
Small Magellanic Cloud